Hemistola liliana is a moth in the family Geometridae first described by Charles Swinhoe in 1892. It is found in the Khasi Hills of India.

References

Moths described in 1892
Hemitheini